Unión de Reyes is a municipality and town in the Matanzas Province of Cuba.

History
Unión de Reyes was founded in 1844, and it was established as a municipality on July 1, 1879. Its name derives from Unión en el Punto de Reyes, so named for its location at a railway junction.

Geography
The municipality, originally divided into the barrios of Iglesia and Unión, is divided into 9 consejos populares (i.e. "people's councils"): the town of Unión de Reyes and the villages of Alacranes, Bermejas, Cabezas, Cidra, Estante, Juan Ávila, Juan G. Gómez and Puerto Rico.

Demographics
In 2004, the municipality of Unión de Reyes had a population of 40,022.

See also
Municipalities of Cuba
List of cities in Cuba

References

External links

Populated places in Matanzas Province